Admiral Sir Joseph Sydney Yorke KCB (6 June 1768 – 5 May 1831) was an officer of the Royal Navy. As a junior officer he saw action at the Battle of the Saintes in April 1782 during the American Revolutionary War. He commanded  at the defeat of the Dutch fleet in August 1795 during the French Revolutionary Wars and went on to be First Naval Lord during the closing stages of the Napoleonic Wars.

Family and early life
Yorke was born in Great Berkhampstead, Hertfordshire, on 6 June 1768, the second son, by his second marriage, of the politician Charles Yorke. He joined the navy at the age of 11, becoming a midshipman aboard , then under the command of Sir Charles Douglas, on 15 February 1780. He followed Douglas to his next command, which flew the flag of Admiral George Rodney. Yorke was then present at Rodney's victory over François Joseph Paul de Grasse at the Battle of the Saintes from 9 to 12 April 1782. The end of the American Revolutionary War led to the Formidable returning to Britain to be paid off. Yorke spent three years in total serving on the Newfoundland Station.

Promotions
Yorke was promoted to lieutenant on 16 June 1789, and moved aboard the 50-gun  to serve under Admiral Sir Richard Hughes. He remained aboard her, carrying out cruises into the English Channel until the outbreak of war with France in 1793. He was promoted to Post-Captain on 4 February 1793 and given command of the frigate , then part of a squadron under Admiral Richard Howe. He patrolled off the French port of Brest, and captured the corvette L'Espiegle.

On 22 August 1795 the Stag and a small British squadron chased two large ships and a cutter, eventually bringing the sternmost one to battle. An hour-long fight ensued, after which the enemy, subsequently found to be the Batavian frigate Alliance, was forced to surrender. Yorke moved to command the newly built  in March 1800, and by 1801 was in command of the 74-gun third rate . He commanded her until the Treaty of Amiens in 1802 brought a period of temporary peace.

Knighthood and flag rank
Yorke was knighted during this period of service, on 21 April 1805, by King George III. On 23 April, Yorke was present at the installation of the Knights of the Garter, standing in for his brother, Philip Yorke, Earl of Hardwicke. Philip was at this time Lord Lieutenant of Ireland, and so was unable to be present in person. In 1810 Joseph Yorke's brother, Charles Philip Yorke became First Lord of the Admiralty and Joseph was transferred from command of the Christian VII to take up a seat on the Board of Admiralty.

Joseph Yorke was promoted to Rear-Admiral of the Blue on 31 July 1810 and hoisted his flag in the 74-gun  in January 1811. He sailed to the Tagus carrying reinforcements for Arthur Wellesley's army, fighting in the Peninsular War. After carrying this out he escorted a fleet returning to Britain from the East Indies. Yorke was promoted to Rear-Admiral of the White on 12 August 1812, Rear-Admiral of the Red on 4 December 1813 and Vice-Admiral of the Blue on 14 June 1814. He served as First Naval Lord in the Liverpool ministry from October 1813 until May 1816 but remained on the Admiralty Board until April 1818. He was appointed a Knight Commander of the Order of the Bath (KCB) in the restructuring of that order in January 1815, promoted Vice-Admiral of the White on 12 August 1819, and promoted to Admiral of the Blue on 22 July 1830.

Parliamentary career
Yorke stood as a candidate for the constituency of Reigate in 1790, and was returned as its member. He represented the borough until 1806, when he was elected as member for St Germans. He stood aside, "taking the Chiltern Hundreds" in 1810 so that his brother, Charles Philip Yorke, could be elected. In the 1812 general election Joseph Yorke stood as a candidate for Sandwich and was returned as its member. He represented the borough until 1818 when he was re-elected to the Reigate constituency, which he represented until his death. Yorke's business interests include the chairmanship of the Waterloo Bridge Company.

Family and personal life
On 29 March 1798, Yorke married Elizabeth Weake Rattray, the daughter of James Rattray, in Ireland. The couple had a number of children before Elizabeth's death on 20 January 1812. His eldest son, Charles Yorke also served in the navy, rising to the rank of admiral, and on the death without heir of Joseph Yorke's brother Philip, the 3rd Earl of Hardwicke in 1834, Charles became the 4th Earl. His daughter Agneta Elizabeth Yorke married the banker Robert Cooper Lee Bevan.

On 22 May 1813, Joseph married a second time, to Urania Anne, the Dowager Marchioness of Clanricarde, and daughter of George Paulet, 12th Marquess of Winchester, at St. Martin in the Fields, Westminster, London. The marriage did not produce any children.

Death
On 5 May 1831 Yorke was returning from visiting Henry Hotham's flagship, then moored at Spithead. He was making his way back to shore aboard the yacht Catherine, in company with Captains Matthew Barton Bradby and Thomas Young, and a seaman named John Chandler, when the boat was struck by lightning in Stokes Bay, causing it to capsize. All aboard were drowned. The bodies were later recovered and an inquest returned a verdict of accidental death. Yorke was buried at the family tomb in the parish church at Wimpole, close to Wimpole Hall, the seat of the Earls of Hardwicke.

References

Sources

J. K. Laughton, ‘Yorke, Sir Joseph Sydney (1768–1831)’, rev. Andrew Lambert, Oxford Dictionary of National Biography, Oxford University Press, 2004, .

External links 
 
Yorke's entry in thepeerage.com
Copy of the announcement of the deaths in The Times
Portrait and short biography of Yorke at the National Maritime Museum

|-

1768 births
1831 deaths
Royal Navy admirals
Royal Navy personnel of the American Revolutionary War
Royal Navy personnel of the French Revolutionary Wars
British naval commanders of the Napoleonic Wars
Knights Commander of the Order of the Bath
Tory MPs (pre-1834)
Members of the Parliament of the United Kingdom for St Germans
Members of the Parliament of Great Britain for English constituencies
Members of the Parliament of the United Kingdom for English constituencies
British MPs 1790–1796
British MPs 1796–1800
UK MPs 1801–1802
UK MPs 1802–1806
UK MPs 1806–1807
UK MPs 1807–1812
UK MPs 1812–1818
UK MPs 1818–1820
UK MPs 1820–1826
UK MPs 1826–1830
UK MPs 1830–1831
Deaths due to shipwreck at sea
Accidental deaths in England
Joseph Sydney
People from Berkhamsted
Members of the Parliament of the United Kingdom for West Looe
Lords of the Admiralty